The South San Francisco Hillside Sign is a historic sign on a hillside overlooking the city of South San Francisco in San Mateo County, California. It was created in the 1920s and was listed on the National Register of Historic Places in 1996. The sign is the main feature of Sign Hill Park, a city park which provides  of open space, almost  of hiking trails, and access to the letters of the sign itself.

The sign spells out "SOUTH SAN FRANCISCO THE INDUSTRIAL CITY" in white-painted concrete letters and is visible to drivers on northbound U.S. 101 and flights to San Francisco International Airport.

Design and setting
The letters are set on the south side of a steep  hill, part of the San Bruno Mountains, overlooking the city.

History

An early version of the sign was installed on the hillside in 1923. Each letter was laid out by city engineer George A. Kneese to ensure even spacing and appearance. The letters for the first sign were carved directly into the hillside and filled with whitewash, consisting of a mixture of lime, white cement, and water; it was completed by November 22, 1923. Local high school students were hired to maintain the sign by removing grass and applying fresh whitewash. The construction method and scale of the sign were comparable to an earlier sign constructed in 1909 on the side of Yerba Buena Island to advertise the Portola Festival.

The current, permanent sign was created in 1929. The sign is cited as a prime example of "civic boosterism"; the intention was to advertise the city's welcoming attitude toward industry. Its location was chosen so as to be visible from the main north-south highways El Camino Real and the Bayshore Highway, as well as from the train and the nearby Mills Field airfield (now San Francisco International Airport). The sign was originally proposed, and the first sign was placed, by the South San Francisco Chamber of Commerce. The $5,000 cost of the second, permanent sign was funded by a special property tax assessment approved by the voters.

At that time the city "was the smokestack capital of the Peninsula." There were steel and cement plants, meat packers, shipbuilders and many other industrial plants; major companies included W. P. Fuller Paint, Western Pipe and Steel Company, the Metal and Thermit Corporation, and the Western Meat Company. A shipbuilding yard on Oyster Point built 45 ships in 48 months for use in World War II.

A giant electric sign was added near the site in 1932; it could spell out letters using twenty individual "letter sections", each of which had twenty-one light boxes to form the pixels of the display. Each light box used fourteen sixty-watt lamps. In addition to displaying "South San Francisco", the sign was used for advertising slogans. It was turned off in 1939 as a potential beacon for aerial attack and never relit.

Following World War II the city's economy transitioned from heavy industry to light industry and then to high-tech and biotech companies. The city's largest employer is now Genentech, which has promoted South San Francisco as "the birthplace of biotechnology". As a result of this shift away from industry as the city's economic focus, there was a movement during the 1980s to tear down the sign or change it to "the industrious city". In response, the city's Historic Preservation Commission and Historical Society persuaded the City Council to seek historic designation, which was awarded in 1996.

See also
List of hillside letters

References

External links
Sign Hill website

South San Francisco, California
Hill figures in the United States
National Register of Historic Places in San Mateo County, California
Individual signs in the United States
History of San Mateo County, California
Geoglyphs
Monuments and memorials on the National Register of Historic Places in California
Individual signs on the National Register of Historic Places
1923 establishments in California